Drummersdale is a hamlet in the civil parish of Scarisbrick, West Lancashire, England.

Etymology
The etymology is doubtful, although the final element of the name is certainly either Old English dæl "dale, valley" or the cognate Old Norse dalr, as in Rochdale. The name was recorded as Drimersdele in 1152.

Transport 
Drummersdale lies on the B5242 road and is near Bescar Lane railway station on the Manchester to Southport line.

External links 

Hamlets in Lancashire
Geography of the Borough of West Lancashire